The 2015 World Fencing Championships were held at the Olympic Stadium in Moscow, Russia from 13 to 19 July 2015.

Schedule
The schedule of the competition.

Medal summary

Medal table

Men's events

Women's events

References

External links

Official website

 
2015
World Fencing Championships
World Fencing Championships
2015 World Fencing Championships
International fencing competitions hosted by Russia
July 2015 sports events in Russia
2015 in Moscow